RAF Linton-on-Ouse  is a former Royal Air Force (RAF) station at Linton-on-Ouse in North Yorkshire, England,  north-west of York. It had satellite stations at RAF Topcliffe and Dishforth Airfield (British Army).

The station opened in 1937. With the transfer of pilot training to RAF Valley on Anglesey in 2019, the station closed in 2020. In February 2021, the MOD confirmed that no alternative military use had been identified for the site and that it would therefore be sold.

History 
RAF Linton-on-Ouse opened on 13 May 1937 as a bomber airfield and was the home of No. 4 Group RAF until 1940. The base's first commander was Wing Commander A. D. Pryor.

When the Second World War began, bombers were launched from Linton to drop propaganda leaflets over Germany and the base was eventually used to launch bombing raids on Norway, The Netherlands, Germany, and Italy. Linton was one of 11 stations allocated to No. 6 Group, Royal Canadian Air Force during the war.

In May 1941 the station was bombed by the Luftwaffe resulting in the death of 13 airmen including the station commander, Group Captain Garroway. A York Press article refers to the 'mystery' of how Garroway was killed – the station's record books state he was directing firefighting when he met his death, not taking shelter. His son, who was also in the RAF, was later killed in action.

At the end of the war the station was involved with transporting passengers and freight back to the UK. After which it became a Fighter Command station operating the Gloster Meteor, Canadair Sabre and Hawker Hunter until it was closed and put under care and maintenance in 1957.

On 9 September 1957, the base was reopened as the home of No. 1 Flying Training School (FTS) and was responsible for training pilots for both the RAF and the Royal Navy's Fleet Air Arm.

In October 1975 Headquarters No. 23 Group RAF disbanded at the station.

In 1981 the BBC filmed episode 5 'Chopped' of the Fighter Pilot series at the base. Chief Flying instructor at the time was Squadron Leader John David Lunt (Later Group Captain).

In 1985, engineering and supply services were contracted out to private firms. The contract for this is currently held by Babcock International.

In 1999 the entire NCO married quarter site at Linton Woods were purchased by The Welbeck Estate Group and underwent a major upgrade.

No. 72(R) Squadron provided Basic Fast Jet Training (BFJT) at Linton-on-Ouse on the Short Tucano T1 before the Squadron's move to RAF Valley in November 2019.

The Yorkshire Universities Air Squadron relocated to RAF Linton-on-Ouse from RAF Church Fenton in 2014. YUAS operated the Grob Tutor T1 aircraft.

The station also housed a memorial room (limited public opening) which recounts the history of the base and the units which have been associated with it.

Drawdown and closure 
In October 2014, it was confirmed by the Ministry of Defence (MOD) that basic fast-jet training would move from Linton-on-Ouse to RAF Valley in Anglesey in 2019. The move was part of the UK Military Flying Training System (UKMFTS) which saw the Beechcraft Texan T1 replace the Tucano T1 in the basic fast-jet training role. At that time, the MOD did not confirm what future role Linton-on-Ouse would have, but in July 2018, it was stated that the RAF would vacate the base by 2020 and it would be disposed of completely. However, in March 2019, the MOD indicated it was considering options for other defence uses for the site, before a final decision was made.

Flying training ceased in October 2019, when the final student pilots graduated and training fully relocated to Valley. The final flying unit to depart was the Yorkshire Universities Air Squadron, which relocated to RAF Leeming on 1 December 2020. The MOD notified the Civil Aviation Authority that the aerodrome would close on 18 December 2020. In February 2021, the MOD confirmed that no alternative military use had been identified for the site and that it would therefore be made available for sale by the end of 2023.

In August 2021, the station was used to support COVID-19 countermeasures for personnel returning from Afghanistan on Operation Pitting.

Proposed processing centre for asylum seekers 

In April 2022, the government announced its intention to convert the camp into a reception, accommodation and processing centre for asylum seekers, as a way of defraying the £4.7 million per day cost of hotels being used. The plan was met by resistance from local residents who claim that asylum seekers will outnumber existing residents. The press has used the moniker "Guantánamo-on-Ouse" to describe the proposal, in reference to the Guantanamo Bay detention camp. However, on 9 August 2022, the government backtracked on this policy, with Defence Secretary Ben Wallace stating this plan would now not go ahead.

Motorsport 

In the summers of 1960 and 1961, the perimeter track and parts of two runways were used to form the 1.7 mile, Linton-on-Ouse circuit, on what was still an operational RAF base, with the racing organised by the Northern branch of the British Racing and Sports Car Club. The 1960 meeting was held in torrential rain and Tony Hodgetts recalls blue sparks coming off his fingers as he cranked the field telephone which was used by the marshals to communicate with race control. The meeting was dominated by Jimmy Blumer in his Cooper Monaco T49. The final meeting in 1961 was marred by a fatal accident to a flag marshal. The driver of the Formula Junior car involved was a serving RAF officer and, following the inquest into the death of the marshal, the venue was no longer available. After this sad incident and a near fatality to another flag marshal at Full Sutton Circuit, Tony Hodgetts and Garth Nicholls started a campaign which resulted in flag marshals working face to face instead of back to back, a system which is still in use and is considerably safer.

Units

The following squadrons were here at some point:

Units

November 2008 incident
In early November 2008 Wing Commander Paul Gerrard, who was based at the station, was involved in an unusual mid-air rescue. Sixty-five-year-old Jim O'Neill was flying a four-seater Cessna 182 from Scotland to Essex after a family holiday, when he had a stroke which caused temporary blindness. Gerrard was on a training flight, and after being alerted to the situation, located O'Neill's aircraft and over a 45-minute period, guided O'Neill to a safe landing at Linton.

See also
List of Royal Air Force stations

References

Bibliography

External links 

 
 UK Military Aeronautical Information Publication – Linton-on-Ouse (EGXU)

Airports in England
RAF Linton
Royal Air Force stations in Yorkshire
Royal Air Force stations of World War II in the United Kingdom
Military history of North Yorkshire